John Edward Francis Beck (1 August 1934 – 24 April 2000) was a New Zealand cricketer who played in eight Test matches between 1953 and 1956.

International career
An attacking left-handed batsman and fine fieldsman, John Beck was selected for the tour to South Africa in 1953–54 at the age of 19 and before he had played a first-class match: chosen "on the basis of his schoolboy form and his raw promise". In the Third Test at Cape Town he was run out for 99 after he and John Reid had put on 174 for the fifth wicket, including 165 in the two hours between lunch and tea on the second day.

In New Zealand's first ever Test victory, against the West Indies at Auckland in 1955–56, he made 38 in the first innings, adding 104 for the fifth wicket with Reid, the highest partnership of the low-scoring match.

Domestic career
He played for Wellington with mixed success from 1954–55 to 1961–62. His highest score was 149 against Canterbury in 1955–56.

Beck has been referred to as "one of the great mystery players of the age – he promised everything and achieved almost nothing." It was widely felt that he lacked the discipline to make the most of his talents.

References

Sources
 Brooke, R. "Book Reviews", The Cricket Statistician, The Association of Cricket Statisticians and Historians: West Bridgford, Nottingham.

External links
 

New Zealand Test cricketers
New Zealand cricketers
Wellington cricketers
1934 births
2000 deaths
North Island cricketers